Darcy Loewen (born February 26, 1969) is a Canadian former professional ice hockey player. Loewen played 135 games in the National Hockey League with the Buffalo Sabres and Ottawa Senators between 1989 and 1994.

Career
Loewen first gained attention as a member of the WHL's Spokane Chiefs, twice scoring 30 or more goals in a season. He was drafted in the third round (55th overall) by the Buffalo Sabres in the 1988 NHL Entry Draft and represented Canada at the 1989 World Junior Championships. Loewen turned pro in 1989-90 with Buffalo's AHL affiliate, the Rochester Americans, with whom he spent the majority of his first three pro seasons.

Loewen's big break at the pro level came in 1992, when the expansion Ottawa Senators selected him in the 1992 NHL Expansion Draft. He was a member of Ottawa's opening night roster on October 8, 1992, and played in 79 games with the Senators during their inaugural season. Though he recorded only 4 goals and 9 nine points that season, Loewen's hard work and intensity made him a fan favorite in Ottawa.

He officially announced his retirement from hockey on June 2, 2000.

Personal
Loewen is married with two children. firefighter with the North Las Vegas Fire Department.

Career statistics

Regular season and playoffs

International

References

External links
 

1969 births
Living people
Buffalo Sabres draft picks
Buffalo Sabres players
Canadian expatriate ice hockey players in England
Canadian expatriate ice hockey players in the United States
Canadian ice hockey left wingers
Idaho Steelheads (WCHL) players
Las Vegas Thunder players
Nottingham Panthers players
Ottawa Senators players
Rochester Americans players
Spokane Chiefs players
Ice hockey people from Calgary
Utah Grizzlies (IHL) players